Ruslan Ruslanovich Akhvlediani (born 8 December 1987) is a Russian football player who plays for FC Metallurg Lipetsk.

Club career
He made his debut in the Russian Football National League for FC Metallurg Lipetsk on 11 July 2021 in a game against FC Tom Tomsk.

References

External links
 
 Profile by Russian Football National League

1987 births
Russian sportspeople of Georgian descent
People from Lipetsk Oblast
Sportspeople from Lipetsk Oblast
Living people
Russian footballers
Association football forwards
FC Metallurg Lipetsk players
Russian Second League players
Russian First League players